The 2017 Cerezo Osaka season was the club's 17th in the J.League 1 and its first following promotion from the 2016 J.League Division 2. The 2017 season would be the most successful season in the club's history to date, as they tied their highest league position, scored the highest number of points in the first division in their history, and won both the Emperor's Cup and the J.League Cup.

Squad
As of 25 January 2017.

Out on loan

Senior

J1 League

U-23

J3 League

References

External links
 J.League official site

Cerezo Osaka
Cerezo Osaka seasons